The 2020 Finnish Indoor Athletics Championships was the 59th edition of the national championship in indoor track and field for Finland. It was held on 15 and 16 February at the Tampere Exhibition and Sports Centre in Tampere, with local club Tampereen Pyrintö taking on hosting duties.

Results

Men

Women

References

Results
Tulokset: SM-Hallikilpailut Tampere . Tilastopaja. Retrieved 2020-03-03.
SM-Hallit 15.-16.2.2020 Tampere Aikataulu, lähtölistat ja tulokset . Time4Results. Retrieved 2020-03-03.

External links 
 Official website of the Finnish Amateur Athletic Association

2020
Finnish Athletics Championships
Finnish Championships
Athletics Championships
Sport in Tampere